Saint-Maurice-sur-Adour (Saint-Maurice on Adour) is a commune in the Landes department in Nouvelle-Aquitaine in southwestern France.

Description

The commune of Saint-Maurice-sur-Adour is located south of Mont-de-Marsan.
It originated as a bastide (fortified town) built in the 13th century by Edward II of England.
The village is rustic, and contains a 16th-century church and the Château de Saint Maurice.

Population

See also
Communes of the Landes department

References

Sources

 

Communes of Landes (department)